Mujić is a Bosnian surname. Its literal meaning is "descendant of Mujo" (Mujo being a nickname for a person with the given name of either Mustafa or Muhamed) and it may indicate Muslim religious affiliation of its bearers. People with the name include:
 Deniz Mujić (born 1990), Austrian footballer of Bosnian descent
 Muhamed Mujić (1933–2016), Bosnian footballer
 Muzafer Mujić (born 1931), Bosnian physiologist
 Nazif Mujić (1970–2018), Bosnian actor

References

Bosnian surnames
Patronymic surnames